The C-35 is a highway in Catalonia, Spain.  It connects the Costa Brava with the Autopista AP-7 to Barcelona.

The road starts at the junction with the Autovia C-65 and then heads west to the south of Llagostera to Vidreres.  This section is being upgraded to Autovia standard.  After junctions with the N-II and AP-7 (junction 9) the road follows the river valley below the Montseny Range passing through Maçanet de la Selva, Hostalric, Breda, Sant Celoni before ending at junction 12 of the AP-7 and the Autovia C-60. The C-35 will be part of the Eix Maçanet-Platja d'Aro, with Autovia C-65 and Autovia C-31.

External links
Eix Maçanet-Platja d'Aro Catalonia Government website 

C-35